Nops is a genus of medium-sized South American, Central American, and Caribbean spiders in the family Caponiidae, first described by Alexander Macleay in 1839. It has a great richness on the Caribbean islands, and most mainland species are located in high proportion toward the Caribbean coast. It likely has a neotropical distribution, though most species of South America are known only from the coast of Colombia and Venezuela, including the islands of Aruba, Curaçao, Bonaire and Trinidad.

Monophyly 
Nops have subsegmeted tarsi, as well as two other leg characters often found in nopine genera: a ventral translucent keel on the anterior metatarsi and a translucent membrane between the anterior metatarsi and tarsi. These spiders can be distinguished from similar genera with these modifications by their elongated unpaired claw on the anterior legs, extending dorsally between the paired claws.

Species 
 it contains thirty-eight species plus one fossil in Dominican amber:
Nops agnarssoni Sánchez-Ruiz, Brescovit & Alayón, 2015 – Puerto Rico
Nops alexenriquei Sánchez-Ruiz & Brescovit, 2018 – Brazil
Nops amazonas Sánchez-Ruiz & Brescovit, 2018 – Brazil
Nops anisitsi Strand, 1909 – Paraguay
Nops bahia Sánchez-Ruiz & Brescovit, 2018 – Brazil
Nops bellulus Chamberlin, 1916 – Peru
Nops blandus (Bryant, 1942) – Virgin Is. (US and UK)
Nops branicki (Taczanowski, 1874) – French Guiana
Nops campeche Sánchez-Ruiz & Brescovit, 2018 – Mexico, Belize, Costa Rica
Nops coccineus Simon, 1892 – Saint Vincent and the Grenadines (St. Vincent)
Nops enae Sánchez-Ruiz, 2004 – Cuba
Nops ernestoi Sánchez-Ruiz, 2005 – Hispaniola (Dominican Rep.)
Nops farhati Prosen, 1949 – Argentina
Nops finisfurvus Sánchez-Ruiz, Brescovit & Alayón, 2015 – Virgin Is. (UK), Puerto Rico (Culebra Is.)
Nops flutillus Chickering, 1967 – Curaçao
Nops gertschi Chickering, 1967 – Hispaniola (Dominican Rep.)
Nops glaucus Hasselt, 1887 – Netherlands Antilles (Bonaire)
Nops guanabacoae MacLeay, 1839 (type) – Cuba, Bahamas
Nops hispaniola Sánchez-Ruiz, Brescovit & Alayón, 2015 – Hispaniola (Haiti, Dominican Rep.)
Nops ipojuca Sánchez-Ruiz & Brescovit, 2018 – Brazil
Nops itapetinga Sánchez-Ruiz & Brescovit, 2018 – Brazil
Nops jaragua Sánchez-Ruiz & Brescovit, 2018 – Dominican Rep.
Nops largus Chickering, 1967 – Panama
Nops maculatus Simon, 1893 – Venezuela, Trinidad, Guyana
Nops mathani Simon, 1893 – Brazil
Nops meridionalis Keyserling, 1891 – Brazil
Nops minas Sánchez-Ruiz & Brescovit, 2018 – Brazil
Nops navassa Sánchez-Ruiz & Brescovit, 2018 – Navassa Is. (Haiti or USA)
Nops nitidus Simon, 1907 – Brazil
Nops pallidus Sánchez-Ruiz & Brescovit, 2018 – Cuba
Nops pocone Sánchez-Ruiz & Brescovit, 2018 – Brazil
Nops quito Dupérré, 2014 – Ecuador
Nops siboney Sánchez-Ruiz, 2004 – Cuba
Nops sublaevis Simon, 1893 – Venezuela
Nops tico Sánchez-Ruiz & Brescovit, 2018 – Costa Rica, Panama
Nops toballus Chickering, 1967 – Jamaica
Nops ursumus Chickering, 1967 – Panama
Nops variabilis Keyserling, 1877 – Colombia, Venezuela

Image gallery

References 

Caponiidae
Araneomorphae genera
Spiders of the Caribbean
Arthropods of the Dominican Republic
Spiders of Central America
Spiders of South America